In mathematics, the determinantal conjecture of  and  asks whether the determinant of a sum A + B of two n by n normal complex matrices A and B lies in the convex hull of the n! points Πi (λ(A)i + λ(B)σ(i)), where the numbers λ(A)i and λ(B)i are the eigenvalues of A and B, and σ is an element of the symmetric group Sn.

References

Determinants
Conjectures